Schizothorax nepalensis is a cyprinid fish species of the genus Schizothorax. It was first collected in 1979 in the alpine fresh water Rara Lake located in Nepal's Rara National Park.

References 

Schizothorax
Fish described in 1984
Taxa named by Akira Terashima